Ville Koistinen (born July 17, 1982) is a Finnish professional ice hockey defenceman currently playing with HPK in the Finnish Liiga.

Playing career
Undrafted, Koistinen played professionally in his native Finland with Ilves Tampere of the SM-liiga for 6 seasons. On May 18, 2006, Koistinen signed with the Nashville Predators of the NHL. Koistinen made his North American debut in the 2006–07 season, playing with the Predators affiliate, the Milwaukee Admirals. He was chosen to AHL-All Star Classic that year scoring 9 goals and 41 points in 59 games.

Koistinen signed a 1-year contract with Predators for the 2007–08 . Koistinen scored his first NHL goal against Fredrik Norrena of the Columbus Blue Jackets in a 4-3 victory on December 27, 2007. Koistinen established 17 points by season end.

After his second season with the Predators in 2008–09, Koistinen signed a two-year contract with the Florida Panthers on July 1, 2009.

On November 25, the Florida Panthers placed Koistinen on waivers. Koistinen cleared waivers on November 26 and was sent to Florida's AHL affiliate in Rochester, New York.

His contract was bought out in the summer, leaving Koistinen as a free agent. He signed a 1-year contract back to Europe and to Swedish Elitserien club, Skellefteå AIK. Club placed second overall by losing Elitserien finals to Färjestads BK.

In the 2011–12 season Koistinen signed one of the biggest contracts so far in Finnish elite league SM-liiga by signing a 7-year deal with Ilves Tampere. During the regular season after 28 games scoring 7 goals and 17 points, KHL team Salavat Yulajev Ufa signed Koistinen to a 2-year deal. His contract with Ilves Tampere continues after the 2-year KHL contract.

In 2013 Koistinen elected to sign a one-year contract with HC Davos of the National League A. In 2014 Koistinen chose to revoke his contract with Ilves Tampere and signed a 3-year extension with HC Davos  until 2017. After two seasons with Davos, Koistinen opted to leave the club and sign a one-year deal with fellow Swiss club, the SCL Tigers on May 19, 2015. He eventually played for SCL until the end of 2017. On January 2, 2018, he moved to ERC Ingolstadt of the German DEL.

In June 2018 Koistinen was convicted of domestic abuse in Finland after he was found guilty of hitting, kicking, and strangling his wife, the couple had been married since 2007 and have two children. It was also revealed that his sudden departure from SCL Tigers six months earlier was due to an extramarital affair with a young woman working for the club.

International play

Koistinen participated World Ice Hockey Championships 2007, 2008 and 2009 and helped Team Finland to a silver medal in 2007 and bronze medal in 2008.

Career statistics

Regular season and playoffs

International

References

External links

1982 births
Living people
HC Davos players
Finnish ice hockey defencemen
Florida Panthers players
Ilves players
ERC Ingolstadt players
Milwaukee Admirals players
Nashville Predators players
Rochester Americans players
Salavat Yulaev Ufa players
SCL Tigers players
Skellefteå AIK players
HC Sparta Praha players
Sportspeople from Oulu
Undrafted National Hockey League players
HPK players
Finnish expatriate ice hockey players in the United States
Finnish expatriate ice hockey players in the Czech Republic
Finnish expatriate ice hockey players in Russia
Finnish expatriate ice hockey players in Germany
Finnish expatriate ice hockey players in Switzerland
Finnish expatriate ice hockey players in Sweden